The 1996–97 Czech Extraliga season was the fourth season of the Czech Extraliga since its creation after the breakup of Czechoslovakia and the Czechoslovak First Ice Hockey League in 1993.

Standings

Playoffs

Quarterfinal
 HC Petra Vsetín - HC Slavia Praha 2:1 (2:0,0:0,0:1)
 HC Petra Vsetín - HC Slavia Praha 4:1 (3:0,1:1,0:0)
 HC Slavia Praha - HC Petra Vsetín 0:7 (0:2,0:4,0:1)
 HC Železárny Třinec - HC IPB Pojišťovna Pardubice 1:4 (0:0,1:1,0:3)
 HC Železárny Třinec - HC IPB Pojišťovna Pardubice 4:3 (3:1,0:1,1:1)
 HC IPB Pojišťovna Pardubice - HC Železárny Třinec 6:1 (2:1,2:0,2:0)
 HC IPB Pojišťovna Pardubice - HC Železárny Třinec 6:0 (3:0,1:0,2:0)
 HC Vítkovice - HC Poldi Kladno 6:2 (3:0,1:2,2:0)
 HC Vítkovice - HC Poldi Kladno 3:0 (0:0,0:0,3:0)
 HC Poldi Kladno - HC Vítkovice 3:8 (1:3,2:3,0:2)
 HC Sparta Praha - HC České Budějovice 3:4 SN (1:1,1:2,1:0,0:0)
 HC Sparta Praha - HC České Budějovice 3:1 (2:0,1:0,0:1)
 HC České Budějovice - HC Sparta Praha 4:2 (2:1,1:0,1:1)
 HC České Budějovice - HC Sparta Praha 2:4 (0:1,0:2,2:1)
 HC Sparta Praha - HC České Budějovice 5:2 (1:0,3:0,1:2)

Semifinal
 HC Petra Vsetín - HC IPB Pojišťovna Pardubice 10:1 (6:0,1:0,3:1)
 HC Petra Vsetín - HC IPB Pojišťovna Pardubice 5:1 (1:0,2:1,2:0)
 HC IPB Pojišťovna Pardubice - HC Petra Vsetín 3:2 PP (2:2,0:0,0:0,1:0)
 HC IPB Pojišťovna Pardubice - HC Petra Vsetín 1:4 (0:0,0:3,1:1)
 HC Sparta Praha - HC Vítkovice 2:6 (1:3,1:1,0:2)
 HC Sparta Praha - HC Vítkovice 2:3 PP (0:0,1:0,1:2,0:1)
 HC Vítkovice - HC Sparta Praha 4:2 (1:1,1:0,2:1)

3rd place
 HC IPB Pojišťovna Pardubice - HC Sparta Praha 5:6 PP (1:1,0:2,4:2,0:1)
 HC Sparta Praha - HC IPB Pojišťovna Pardubice 4:1 (2:1,0:0,2:0)

Final
HC Vsetin - HC Vitkovice 3-1, 4-2, 2-0

HC Vsetin is 1996-97 Czech champion.

Relegation

First series
 HC Dukla Jihlava - HC Kralupy nad Vltavou 4:2 (1:2,3:0,0:0)
 HC Dukla Jihlava - HC Kralupy nad Vltavou 3:1 (2:0,0:0,1:1)
 HC Kralupy nad Vltavou - HC Dukla Jihlava 3:1 (0:0,1:0,2:1)
 HC Kralupy nad Vltavou - HC Dukla Jihlava 0:3 (0:2,0:1,0:0)
 HC Dukla Jihlava - HC Kralupy nad Vltavou 7:0 (1:0,2:0,4:0)

Second series
 HC Slezan Opava - HC Becherovka Karlovy Vary 6:1 (0:0,2:0,4:1)
 HC Slezan Opava - HC Becherovka Karlovy Vary 4:1 (0:1,2:0,2:0)
 HC Becherovka Karlovy Vary - HC Slezan Opava 3:4 SN (1:1,2:1,0:1,0:0)
 HC Becherovka Karlovy Vary - HC Slezan Opava 4:2 (1:0,2:2,1:0)
 HC Slezan Opava - HC Becherovka Karlovy Vary 1:3 (0:1,0:1,1:1)
 HC Becherovka Karlovy Vary - HC Slezan Opava 5:4 SN (1:0,1:3,2:1,0:0)
 HC Slezan Opava - HC Becherovka Karlovy Vary 4:3 (2:1,1:2,1:0)

External links 
 

Czech Extraliga seasons
1996–97 in Czech ice hockey
Czech